Yanoda is a rainforest in Baoting Li and Miao Autonomous County, Hainan, China. The rainforest is a major tourist attraction (as Yanoda Rainforest Cultural Tourism Zone) and is located near the town Sanya.

The Chinese government plans to invest 3.9 billion renminbi into the park area. 45 km2 of the forest are reserved for the Cultural Tourist Zone, the whole area of protected forest is 123 km2. In 2012, the Tourist Zone was rated a AAAAA-scenic spot.

References

External links 
 Official webpage (English)

Tourist attractions in Sanya
Rainforests
AAAAA-rated tourist attractions